Yiwom (Ywom), also known as Gerka or Gerkawa by the Hausa, is a Chadic (Afro-Asiatic) language spoken in Plateau State, Nigeria.

Sociolinguistic background
Ywom was formerly much more widespread, with Ywom toponyms found in southern Tarok-speaking areas. Roger Blench (2013) reports that Ywom is spoken in Hyel Ywom town and nearby hamlets. Many Ywom speak Jukun and Tarok as additional languages. Due to influence from Plateau languages, Ywom has various phonological features that are considered unusual for a West Chadic language, such as labiovelar consonants.

Phonology
Tones are at least high and low. Mid tone may be allophonic. Rising and falling tones are probably restricted to sequences. 

There may also be an ?. Three vowels are long, . 

Consonants are:

Syllable-initial consonant clusters are Cw, Cj, Cr and Cl. NC also occurs; the N takes its own tone.

References

External links
Blench, Roger. 2013. However did Ywom become so strange?.
Paradisec has an open access collection of Roger Blench’s materials that includes Yiwom language materials

West Chadic languages
Languages of Nigeria